"Northwest Mansion Mystery", also listed as "Northwest Mansion Noir", is the tenth episode of the second season of the American animated television series Gravity Falls, created by Alex Hirsch. The episode was written by Jeff Rowe, Hirsch, and Mark Rizzo, and directed by Matt Braly. In the episode, Pacifica Northwest, arch-rival of Dipper Pines, asks Dipper to handle a paranormal ghost at the Northwest Manor at their party, which eventually turns into Pacifica making a choice on whether to continue her family's stained reputation or on starting a new era for the Northwest family. The episode ends on a cliffhanger, with McGucket telling a warning to Dipper that a "big event" is happening soon.

"Northwest Mansion Mystery" premiered on Disney XD on February 16, 2015, and was watched by 1.17 million viewers. It is considered the darkest and scariest episode of Gravity Falls.

Plot 
At the Northwest Manor, the Northwest family are getting ready for their annual party when suddenly, objects start flying around due to a ghost. Preston, Pacifica's father, eventually sends Pacifica over to the Mystery Shack to ask for help, where Dipper, Mabel, and her friends, Candy and Grenda, are watching Gravity Falls Public Access TV, who are covering the party on local news. While gossiping about Pacifica, Pacifica knocks on the Mystery Shack's door and asks Dipper for help, which he reluctantly accepts after Mabel convinces him so that Mabel and her friends can go to the party.

At the Northwest Manor, Preston and Prescilla meet Dipper. After Pacifica forces Dipper to change into formal attire, Pacifica brags to Dipper about the Northwest family's "high standards" while taking him to the "problem room". Meanwhile, Mabel and her friends gossip about boys coming to the party. Grenda eventually develops a crush on Baron Marius von Fundshauser.

In the "problem room", Dipper investigates the room, and while investigating, finds that a figure of a painting in the room has disappeared. At the same time, Pacifica notices blood coming from the mouths of taxidermy heads, which chant "Ancient sins!". Dipper, under realizing he has grossly underestimated the ghost, doesn't know what to do. The heads start chanting about an ancient prophecy for revenge, when suddenly a lumberjack ghost with an ax in his head comes out of the fireplace in the room, pursuing a member of the Northwest family. Dipper and Pacifica hide under a table, but are quickly discovered and run from the ghost. Meanwhile, Marius enters the party. Mabel and her friends decide to make a plan on how to seduce Marius.

Pacifica and Dipper run through a garden while Dipper tries to find a silver mirror to trap the ghost. Upon finding one in a silver room, Pacifica relents, saying that her parents would "kill" her, as Dipper has dirty shoes that would stain her parent's favorite carpet pattern. The two argue and eventually end up in a hidden room behind a painting, letting the ghost fly away freely. The ghost finds them in the room, but Dipper eventually traps him with a handheld silver mirror. Dipper and Pacifica eventually fall into the garden, where they share a hug. Her family thanks Dipper, and Dipper eventually leaves the party, having a newfound opinion on Pacifica that she is not the person that he thinks he is. However, the ghost warns him otherwise, saying that 150 years ago, the Northwests robbed the lumberjacks that built Northwest Manor. After dying in a mudslide, the lumberjack put a curse on the Northwest family, saying that if the family still refused to honor their promise for the next 150 years, that he would kill the entire family.

Dipper busts into a room where the Northwest family is, confronting them into lying about the curse. Pacifica tries to defend herself, but is eventually stopped by a bell from her father. Dipper, outside the mansion, accidentally lets the ghost out of the mirror, and eventually runs back to the mansion to save Mabel. Inside the mansion, Mabel and her friends fight over Marius, with Marius eventually developing a crush on Grenda. The ghost eventually enters the mansion, turning people into wood. When Dipper asks how to stop the curse, the ghost says that a Northwest must open the gates to let the general public into the party. When Dipper finds Pacifica in a hidden room, Pacifica is filled with shame, as she has found out her family's true history of lying and scamming the local people of Gravity Falls. Dipper eventually apologizes for his words, and tells Pacifica that it's not too late to change. After the ghost has turned the mansion into wood, Dipper runs to stop the ghost, but then is also turned into wood. Pacifica then confronts the ghost, wanting to open the gate. However, her parents, who are hiding in an underground bunker, try to coerce her to stop by ringing the bell. Pacifica, mainly for the cause of wanting to save Dipper, resists and pulls the lever, to the dismay to her parents. The ghost eventually praises Pacifica as not being like the other Northwests, and eventually fades. The public storm the mansion, and Dipper and Pacifica become friends, with Pacifica hinting a crush on Dipper. Old Man McGucket eventually pulls Dipper into a hallway, warning Dipper of an apocalypse. Dipper shrugs him away to rejoin the party, leaving McGucket worried about the impending event in 24 hours.

Voice cast 

 Jason Ritter as Dipper Pines
 Kristen Schaal as Mabel Pines
 Jackie Buscarino as Pacifica Northwest
 Niki Yang as Candy
 Carl Faruolo as Grenda
 Matt Chapman as Baron Marius von Fundshauser
 Kevin Michael Richardson as the Lumberjack Ghost
 Alex Hirsch as Old Man McGucket

Production 
The episode was written by Gravity Falls creator Alex Hirsch, along with Jeff Rowe and Mark Rizzo. The episode was the first to not feature Soos, Wendy, or Grunkle Stan, as Hirsch stated that they were on a strict 21-minute episode, and that not removing characters that weren't essential to the plot would lead to "Mickey Mouse [eating] me in my sleep."

Critical reception 
Alasdair Wilkins of The A.V. Club awarded the episode an "A-", praising Pacifica's character growth during the episode. Jonathan North of Rotoscopers praised the episode for its dark scenes in a kids' show and its plot.

Due to this episode, the Gravity Falls fandom spawned the ship between Dipper and Pacifica called Dipcifica.

References 

2015 American television episodes
Gravity Falls episodes
Television episodes about ghosts